Anokha Pyar is a 1948 Indian Hindi language film. The film stars Dilip Kumar, Nargis, Nalini Jaywant in lead roles. The black and white romantic love triangle was directed by M. I. Dharamsey under the Ambika Films banner. The music was composed by Anil Biswas, who gave a then unknown young Lata Mangeshkar maximum songs to sing for the film. The rest of the cast included Sankatha Prasad, Mukri, Ved, Kesarbai, Habib and Sheikh.

Plot
Ashok (Dilip Kumar) is an impoverished writer waiting for his book to be published. He meets Bindiya (Nalini Jaywant), a flower-seller, who insists he buy some flowers from her. Ashok gives his last two annas (12 pence) to her. A rogue tries to snatch the money from Bindiya and when Ashok tries to help her, the rogue punches him in the face, temporarily blinding him. Bindiya takes him to the local doctor. Since he has nowhere to stay, Ashok stays with the doctor and his family until he improves. The doctor's daughter Geeta (Nargis) falls in love with Ashok. Bindiya has also fallen in love with Ashok and cares deeply for him. Ashok is implicated in a murder case and is imprisoned. Geeta's father dies and her two aunts come to stay with her. Meanwhile. Bindiya manages to find a suicide note written by Ashok's alleged victim and Ashok is proven to be innocent. Geeta's aunts happen to see Bindiya with Ashok and believe her to be Ashok's wife. They convince Geeta to marry Ashok's publisher. After some more melodramatic turns in the story, Bindiya dies and Ashok and Geeta unite. Ashok's book is finally published and becomes popular.

Cast 
 Dilip Kumar as Ashok
 Nargis as Geeta
 Nalini Jaywant as Bindiya
 Sankatha Prasad as the publisher
 Mukri
 Munshu Munakka
 Kesarbai
 Amir Bano as one of the aunts

Soundtrack
Lata Mangeshkar was still finding a niche for herself in the Hindi film industry and according to Ganesh Anantharaman, it was a brave move by composer Anil Biswas to use the "tinny vocals" of Lata in songs like "Jeevan Sapna Toot Gaya" and "Mere Liye Woh Gham-E-Intazar Chhod Gaye", sung by Lata Mangeshkar and Meena Kapoor. Other popular songs were "Yaad Rakhna Chaand Taaro" sung by Lata and Mukesh, "Ek Dil Ka Lagana Baqi Tha" sung by Lata. The lyricists were Zia Sarhadi, Gopal Singh Nepali, Behzad Lakhnavi and Shams Azimabadi.

Song list

References

External links
 

1948 films
1940s Hindi-language films
Films scored by Anil Biswas
Indian black-and-white films
Indian romance films
1940s romance films
Hindi-language romance films